The Elisabet Ney Museum is a museum located in Austin, Texas, United States.  It is housed in the former studio of sculptor Elisabet Ney and is dedicated to showcasing her life and works. There is a permanent collection of her portrait busts and personal memorabilia on display.

History
Formosa, as Ney called the studio, was completed in 1893 and enlarged in 1902. It was the earliest art studio built in Texas. After Ney died in 1907, Ella and Joseph B. Dibrell purchased the building to preserve it as an art center in memory of her. The City of Austin assumed ownership of it in 1941 and it is managed through the city's Parks and Recreation Department. In addition to being a local and state historic landmark, it was added to the National Register of Historic Places on November 29, 1972, and is one of the 40 museums in the Historic Artists' Homes and Studios program.

Until 1973 the Ney museum emphasized the exhibition of contemporary art. From July 1980 to November 1982, the museum was closed for restoration and the installation of a climate-control system, after which the museum began to reconstruct the studio as it was used by Ney. In 2007 the museum commissioned a master plan for restoration of the grounds. Part of this plan has been completed, including planting wild flowers and prairie grasses around the building to better resemble the appearance of the grounds in Ney's time. In 2017 the city of Austin announced a planned restoration of the museum's frame, windows, and doors to improve the building's climate control and a restoration of the property's historic wall and gate. Other planned improvements include a new bridge across Waller Creek, which cuts through the Ney property, and the formation of a supporters group, Friends of the Ney. Recently, the museum has again returned to a focus on contemporary art more than Ney and her work, and holds numerous public events and art exhibitions annually.

Collection

The museum houses a collection of originals and replicas of Ney's works, along with many of her personal belongings and tools. The more than fifty busts, medallions, and full-sized figures on display include her portraits of European notables such as King Ludwig II of Bavaria, Otto von Bismarck, Giuseppe Garibaldi, and Arthur Schopenhauer as well as Americans William Jennings Bryan, Sam Houston, Stephen F. Austin, and General Albert Sidney Johnston.

See also
 List of single-artist museums

References

External links 

 Museum website
 Elisabet Ney Historical Marker

City of Austin Historic Landmarks
Museums in Austin, Texas
Art museums and galleries in Texas
Sculpture galleries in the United States
Women's museums in Texas
Ney, Elizabet
Artists' studios in the United States
Commercial buildings completed in 1893
Art museums established in 1907
German-American culture in Texas
National Register of Historic Places in Austin, Texas
Commercial buildings on the National Register of Historic Places in Texas
Recorded Texas Historic Landmarks
Ney